Takydromus hsuehshanensis is a species of lizard in the family Lacertidae. It is endemic to Taiwan.

References

Takydromus
Reptiles described in 1981
Endemic fauna of Taiwan
Reptiles of Taiwan
Taxa named by Jun-yi Lin
Taxa named by Hsien-yu Cheng